Ear Fun is the third Korean extended play (sixth overall) by the South Korean pop rock band CN Blue. It was released on March 26, 2012 with the track "Hey You" as the promotional single.

Background and release
As a teaser of the mini-album, the song "Still in Love" was released on March 16, along with a special music video featuring scenes of the group in a recording studio. The EP was scheduled to be released on March 27, but it was released one day before the official release due of the high popularity of the song "Still in Love".
The first teaser of the song and music video for "Hey You" was released on March 19 featuring the member Jung Shin. The second teaser was released on March 21 featuring the member Jong Hyun. The third teaser was released on March 22 featuring the member Min Hyuk. The fourth and last teaser was released on March 23 featuring the member Jung Yong-hwa. The full music video of "Hey You" and mini-album were released on March 26. The album also features a Korean version of the song "In My Head", the group's major debut single and fourth overall single in Japan. This version of the song was firstly introduced on KBS's show Music Bank Year-End special on December 23, 2011 with few changes of the lyrics.

A special limited edition of the EP was released on April 10, 2012. It includes the same track list and there will be 140 pages of pictorial photos and a DVD containing a 20-minute clip of the members shooting in the U.S. In addition, the special limited edition will also include four supplemental sections for each of the members (18 pages individual shoot for each of the members).

Composition
The title song "Hey You" was written by Han Seong Ho and composed by Kim Do Hoon and Lee Sang Ho, same writer and composer of the group's other title songs "Intuition", "Love" and "I'm a Loner".

Promotion
The promotions of the song "Hey You" started on March 29, 2012 on Mnet's show M! Countdown. They are also promoting on the shows Music Bank, Music Core, Inkigayo, and Show Champion. Two other songs of the EP were also performed: "Still in Love" was used for the comeback week performances and "In My Head" was used for the goodbye week on Music Bank. The album Ear Fun and the title track "Hey You" won 4 music show awards, from M! Countdown on April 5, Show Champion on April 10, Music Bank on April 20, and Inkigayo mutizen on April 22. The promotions ended on April 22, on SBS Inkigayo.

Track listing
From CNBlue

Chart performance

Album chart

Singles chart

Digital sales

Album sales

Release history

Award and nomination

References

External links 
 CN Blue official YouTube channel

2012 EPs
CNBLUE EPs
Korean-language EPs
FNC Entertainment EPs